Akron–Canton Airport  is a commercial airport in the city of Green, in southern Summit County, Ohio (a small piece of each runway is in Stark County), about  southeast of Akron. It is jointly operated by Summit County and Stark County.  The airport is a "reliever" airport for Northeast Ohio and markets itself as "A better way to go", emphasizing the ease of travel in comparison to Cleveland Hopkins International Airport.  Just under 90% of its traffic is general aviation. It is included in the Federal Aviation Administration (FAA) National Plan of Integrated Airport Systems for 2019–2023, in which it is categorized as a small-hub primary commercial service facility.

The airport has a maintenance base for PSA Airlines, a regional carrier that flies under the American Eagle brand for American Airlines.

History
Public funds for the construction of the airport were allocated during World War II for defense purposes, but construction stalled over a controversy relating to whether public funding of airport construction would be appropriate. As a result, private funding was essential to the initial construction of the airport, particularly in purchasing the land.

The airport was dedicated on October 13, 1946, as the Akron–Canton–Massillon Airport; the name was later changed to Akron–Canton Regional Airport. Passenger air service began in 1948 when American, United, Capital, and Eastern airlines moved from the Akron Fulton International Airport.

A permanent terminal was built in 1955 and expanded in 1962. In the summer of 2020, a new expansion was made to the terminal relocating gates from the original terminal to a new bi-level concourse. The gates and terminal area original to the 1960s are slated for demolition to make room for new aircraft parking areas.

Passenger growth and decline
During the mid-2000s, the airport was one of the fastest-growing airports in the Midwest, attracting passengers from the Akron/Canton area and Cleveland metropolitan area.  The airport's passenger count doubled between 2000 and 2006, with several new routes added by AirTran Airways and Frontier Airlines. The airport experienced its busiest year in 2012, with 1.83 million passengers flying in or out.

Since 2012, passenger traffic has decreased.  Following the acquisition of AirTran Airways, then the airport's largest carrier, by Southwest Airlines in 2011, Southwest reduced AirTran's presence at the airport. Several other low-cost carriers, including JetBlue, Frontier Airlines, and Spirit Airlines, established new routes from nearby Cleveland Hopkins, lowering average airfares at that airport and reducing demand for Cleveland-based travelers to fly out of further-away Akron.  In 2017 Southwest dropped Akron and consolidated operations at Cleveland Hopkins, as did Allegiant Air the same year.

By 2017, the airport's passenger traffic sank to its lowest level since 2004. As of May 2018, the airport had the 2nd fastest declining passenger count of any US airport. 

In the aftermath of the COVID-19 pandemic, the airport suffered further loss of service as Delta Air Lines ceased its long-running service to Atlanta from the airport in 2020, and Spirit Airlines ended all flights to Orlando and seasonal service to Myrtle Beach and Fort Myers in 2022. United Express dropped service to Washington–Dulles in 2022, citing ongoing staff shortages. This service had replaced their erstwhile service to Newark in 2021, although the airline hopes to restart scheduled flights to Dulles in 2023.

Expansion

In 2006 the airport completed an expansion and renovation of the terminal, including the addition of a new wing off the main concourse. It brings the number of gates to 11 (from 9) and provides new baggage areas, a food court, and better aesthetics. The new wing opened to passengers in May 2006 and was home to AirTran Airways and its successor Southwest.

In 2011 the expanded TSA screening area was completed. It has four lanes for screening, with the ability to open two more. Along with the expanded screening area, Advanced Imaging Devices were installed and a TSA Precheck lane was added.

The airport initiated CAK 2018, its 10-year, $110 million Capital Improvement Plan in March 2008. The plan is the most ambitious capital improvement plan in Akron–Canton Airport's history and calls for 10 projects in the next 10 years. One of those projects, a runway expansion, has already been completed. The runways will allow aircraft to fly non-stop to anywhere in the U.S. and throughout Mexico and Canada.

Other projects include expanding aircraft parking and general aviation area, replacing aircraft rescue and firefighting maintenance facility, a new customs and border patrol facility, expanding auto parking lots, a widened entrance road, expanded ticket wing, and TSA screening area, expanded upper-level concourse, and the construction of Port Green Industrial Park,  will be developed into 10-12 business sites.

In June 2021, Breeze Airways launched nonstop flights to Charleston (SC), New Orleans, and Tampa. They have since continued their expansion at the airport, adding scheduled service to Las Vegas, Nashville, and West Palm Beach. Following the withdrawal of Spirit Airlines at CAK, Breeze Airways also announced the commencement of service to Orlando beginning in March 2023.

In September 2021, Allegiant Air announced that they would be discontinuing service to Cleveland and returning to Akron–Canton, flying to 4 different destinations with operations beginning March 2, 2022. Further expansions to Fort Lauderdale and Orlando-Sanford were announced in May 2022.

Airlines and destinations

Passenger

Cargo

Statistics

Top destinations

Airline market shares

Annual traffic

Ground transportation
Akron–Canton Airport has a number of taxicab and shuttle services.

It is also served by one route from each of the region's two public transit providers, Akron Metro Regional Transit route 110, and Canton-based Stark Area Regional Transit Authority (SARTA) route 81.

The SARTA route provides service every hour for most of the day Monday through Saturday and serves both Canton and Akron via Interstate 77, including transit centers in both downtown Canton and downtown Akron.

The Akron Metro route is a five-times-per-day Monday through Friday local route through Southern Summit County, but does serve the downtown Akron Transit Center.

Accidents and incidents
On November 4, 1949, a Harrington's Inc. DC-3, a cargo flight, crashed at CAK short of runway 36 in light snow and limited visibility, hitting trees and landing inverted east of the runway, killing all 3 occupants. This is the worst crash on airport property in its history.

On November 27, 1973, Eastern Airlines Flight 300 was arriving from Pittsburgh International Airport when it ran off the end of the runway. The aircraft was a McDonnell Douglas DC-9-31 with five crew members and 21 passengers, and originated at Miami International Airport with a routing MIA-PIT-CAK. The weather conditions were low ceilings, light rain showers and fog. The National Transportation Safety Board (NTSB) determined that landing at excessive speed too far down the wet runway caused the aircraft to hydroplane and not be able to stop. It went over an embankment and was severely damaged and written off. There were no fatalities, but all 26 on board had various injuries.

On August 2, 1979, a Cessna Citation 501 piloted by New York Yankees catcher, Thurman Munson stalled and crashed  short of runway 19, killing Munson. The two other people in the plane with him were able to escape the plane just as it caught fire. As of 2004, there have been no further deaths at the airport.

References

External links

Route Map
 
 

Airports in Ohio
Transportation in Summit County, Ohio
Buildings and structures in Summit County, Ohio
1946 establishments in Ohio
Airports established in 1946